Turbonilla fasciata is a species of sea snail, a marine gastropod mollusk in the family Pyramidellidae, the pyrams and their allies.

Description
The length of the shell attains 5.5 mm.

Distribution
This species occurs in the Atlantic Ocean off Brazil.

References

External links
 To World Register of Marine Species

fasciata
Gastropods described in 1840